Malenky Theater is a theater company based in Tel Aviv, Israel. The company was founded in 1997 by a group of immigrants from the former Soviet Union and specializes in adaptation of classical literary works

History 
Malenky Theatre was created as a “live theatre”  - an experimental showcase for plays based on literature as source material, deciphering them in a “theatre laboratory” during the rehearsals and giving them a unique twist.

In 2006 Malenky was recognized as a Theatre group by the Ministry of Culture of Israel. The theatre is supported by both Ministry of Culture and Sport of Israel and City Council of Tel Aviv.

Over 20 years of its existence the theatre produced 27 shows, mainly in Hebrew, but some of them in Russian. In current program there are six shows.

In 1997-2014 Igor Berezin was the Artistic Director of Malenky Theatre and the director of most of the shows. Since 2015 the Artistic Director is Michael Teplitsky.

In December 2017 Malenky Theatre released in collaboration with Habima National Theatre a performance “Zemach” - a stage play by Michael Teplitsky based on biography of  - one of the three founders of Habima Theatre - a project is dedicated to a centenary celebration of Habima Theatre.

In 2016 Malenky Theatre took part in an exhibition at Jewish Museum in Berlin with a costume from the show “Golem”

Malenky Theater participated in many international theater festivals in France, Hungary, China, Croatia, Poland, South Korea, Serbia, Macedonia, Moldova and Russia.

Awards 
 2020 - The "Golden Hedgehog" award was given to the show "Free Fall" as "Show of the Year"
 2018 - Award for "Best Performance" Festival VI Incognita Terra
St. Petersburg, Russia for the play "Lear. Puppets and People
 2016 «A team actor award» for the show “The Bastard’s Story (Lear.Puppets and People)” at 29th International Theatrical Festival Valise (Poland)
 2014 Rozenblum prize - a prize to outstanding achievements in theatre field - awarded to Igor Berezin  
 2013 “Golden Hedgehog” prize awarded to Vadim Keshersky for the set design of the show “The Black Monk” 
 2012 Yuri Shtern prize  - a prize for outstanding achievements of immigrant-artists awarded to Michael Teplitsky 
 2010 Mifal HaPayis Landau prize - a prize for significant contribution towards cultural activities awarded to Igor Berezin
 2009 “Golden Hedgehog” prize awarded to Polina Adamov for the set design of the show “Orpheus in Metro” 
 2009 The audience prize at International Monodrama Festival “The One Show”, Bitola, Macedonia awarded for the show "Orpheus in Metro"
 2007 The show “About the Sin” earned “Golden Hedgehog” prize in three nominations: best director (Igor Berezin), best adaptation (Igor Berezin, Boris Entin), best supporting actor (Dudu Niv)
 2005 The Best Israeli Theatre Prize for the show “The Stranger” by Albert Camus as the Fringe Show of the Year 2005  
 2001 Michael Teplitsky earned the first prize at “Teatroneto” Festival for the show “Kontrabass” by Patrick Suskind

Performances 

Malanky Theater Performances
 2021 - "Russian Roulette" A play by Michael Baranowski, directed by Yuri Goldin
 2019 - "Warshaw Melody" A play by Leonid Zorin, directed by Michael Teplitzky
 2019 - "Free Fall" The play directed by Lena Rosenberg and Michael Teplitzky
 2019 - "Mozart and Slayer" directed by Michael Teplitzky
 2018 - "Ha-fa-na-na" directed by Michael Teplitzky
 2018 - "The Story of the Panda Bears Told by a Saxophonist Who Has a Girlfriend in Frankfurt
" based on a play by Mattie Vishniak. Directed by Alexander Bergman (Russia)
 2017 - "Zemach" A play and directed by Michael Teplitzky, inspired by the life of Habima founder Nahum Tzemach (co-production with the Habima National Theater)
 2017 - "Will it never be a war" based on a play by Michael Heifetz that based on the book by Istvan Arkan. Directed by Michael Teplitzky
 2017 - "Alice and the Old Circus", directed by Michael Teplitzky
 2017 - "Snow Story" by Leon Moroz, directed by Leon Moroz
 2016 - "Abandoned Ash" by Michael Baranowski, directed by Yuri Goldin
 2016 - "The Chairs" by Agen Ionescu, directed by Michael Teplitzky
 2015 - "The Stranger" An adaptation of the story of Sergei Dobletov (play in Russian), directed by Michael Teplitzky
 2015 - "Strawberries in the Summer" by Rona Monroe, directed by Rudia Kozlowski
 2015 - "Lear. The Bastard Story", based on the play "King Lear" by William Shakespeare, directed by Michael Teplitzky
 2015 - "The Kislev List" Documentary play, directed by Michael Teplitzky
 2014 - "Wanted, an educated, desperate young man ", the play by Yafim Rinenberg inspired by diaries by Theodor Herzl, directed by Yafim Rinenberg
 2014 - "On the Net" An adaptation of Fyodor Dostoevsky's book " Notes from Underground "
 2013 - "Talk to Me Like Rain" - 2 short plays by Tennessee Williams, directed by Igor Berzin
 2012 - "The Black Monk" based on a play by Anton Chekhov, directed by Igor Berzin
 2011 - "The Golem" according to the myth of the golem in Jewish occultism, directed by Igor Berzin
 2010 - "Job" An adaptation of Joseph Ruth's book, directed by Igor Berzin
 2009 - "Orpheus in the Metro" A solo performance based on his short story by Julio Kortsar, directed by Igor Berzin
 2008 - "The Immigrants" based on a play by Slavomir Marozek, directed by Igor Berzin
 2007 - "On Sin" based on a novel by Fyodor Dostoevsky, directed by Igor Berzin
 2006 - "Witzek" play by Georg Bichner, directed by Igor Berzin
 2005 - "Murder on Goat Island" A play by Ugo Betty, directed by Igor Berzin
 2005 - "The Rose of Jericho", an original play by Roi Chen, directed by Igor Berzin
 2004 - "The Stranger" based on a novel by Albert Camus, directed by Igor Berzin
 2003 - "The Old Woman and the Miracle Worker"  based on the works of Daniel Harmes, directed by Igor Berzin
 2001 - "Double Bass" by Patrick Suskind, solo performance by Michael Teplitsky, directed by Igor Berzin
 2000 - "Absolutely dress rehearsal" A play by Sabba Jacobsdottir, directed by Igor Berzin
 1998 - "The Last Demon" based on the stories of Yitzhak Bashevis-Singer, directed by Igor Berzin
 1997 - "The Game" A play by Anthony Sheffer, directed by Igor Berzin

References

External links 
 

Theatre companies in Israel
1997 establishments in Israel
Entertainment companies established in 1997